Agénor Bardoux (15 January 1829, Bourges, Cher23 November 1897, Paris) was a French statesman and republican, son of Jacques Bardoux (Moulins, 3 February 1795Clermont-Ferrand, 8 January 1871) and wife Thérèse Pignet (Limoges, 6 April 1807St. Saturnin, 25 March 1883).

A native of Bourges, he was established as an advocate in Clermont-Ferrand, and did not hesitate to proclaim his Republican sympathies. In 1871 he was elected deputy of the French National Assembly, and re-elected in 1876 and in 1877. In the chamber he was president of the Centre gauche group, standing strongly for the republic but against anti-clericalism, and during the constitutional crisis of May 1877 he was one of the 363 signatories to the vote of no confidence. In the subsequently elected republican chamber he became minister of public instruction (December 1877) and proposed various republican laws, notably on compulsory primary education. He resigned in 1879. He was not re-elected in 1881 but in December 1882 was named senator for life.

He married in Montpellier on 15 July 1873 Clémence Villa (Millau, 26 December 1847Paris, 2 December 1939), daughter of Achille Villa (Millau, 17 April 1818Millau, 7 April 1901) and wife Sophie Bimar (Montpellier, 13 October 1824Montpellier, 6 February 1885), by whom he had at least one son, the French senator and academic Jacques Bardoux. One of his descendants, Valéry Giscard d'Estaing (born 1926) was president of France from 1974 until 1981.

References

1829 births
1897 deaths
Politicians from Bourges
French republicans
Government ministers of France
Members of the National Assembly (1871)
Members of the 1st Chamber of Deputies of the French Third Republic
Members of the 2nd Chamber of Deputies of the French Third Republic
French life senators
Mayors of Clermont-Ferrand